Temitayo Olufisayo Olaoluwa Aina (born 8 October 1996) is a professional footballer who plays as a wing-back or right back for Serie A club Torino, and the Nigeria national team.

Club career

Chelsea

Early career
Ola Aina signed for Chelsea as an under-11 and made his youth team debut as a schoolboy in the 2012–13 season and went on to start in both legs of the semi-final and final of the FA Youth Cup. In his youth career, he has also represented Chelsea in the under-18s, under-19s, and under-21 levels. On 19 July 2014, Aina made his first-team debut in a pre-season friendly against AFC Wimbledon, after Todd Kane's injury. Aina started the match and was substituted at half-time for Branislav Ivanović as Chelsea went on to win 3–2.

Before the 2015–16 season, he was included in the pre-season tour, playing three matches in the International Champions Cup. After impressing Chelsea manager José Mourinho, Aina was included in the first-team squad for the campaign. Although he spent the entire season training full-time with the first-team, he continued his role in the under-21s and under-19s sides. On 23 September 2015, Aina was included in the match-day squad against Walsall in the fourth round of the League Cup, although he was an unused substitute.

Due to a lack of first-team opportunities, Aina refused a new contract despite his current contact ending at the end of the season.

2016–17 season
On 6 July 2016, he signed a new four-year contract, ending the rumours of him leaving the London side. After signing a new contract, Aina was included in the travelling squad to Austria and the United States. He went on to play in all six pre-season matches. On 23 August 2016, Aina was given his professional debut by manager Antonio Conte in a 3–2 victory over Bristol Rovers in the EFL Cup, being replaced by John Terry in the 77th minute. On 15 October 2016, he made his Premier League debut in a 3–0 victory over reigning champions Leicester City, replacing goalscorer Victor Moses in the 82nd minute.

Loan to Hull City
On 11 July 2017, Chelsea announced that they had loaned Aina to Championship side Hull City. He made his debut on the opening day of the season, 5 August 2017, away to Aston Villa, in a 1–1 draw.
He scored the only goal in a 1–0 defeat of Blackburn Rovers in the third-round of the FA Cup on 6 January 2018.

Torino
On 14 August 2018, Aina joined Italian club Torino on a season-long loan after signing a new three-year deal with Chelsea. He made his Serie A debut a  few days later in Torino's 0–1 opening day defeat at home to Roma, coming on as a substitute in place of fellow right-back Lorenzo De Silvestri who went off injured after just 25 minutes. Aina scored his first goal for Torino in a match against Udinese on 2 February 2019. Aina made 30 Serie A appearances in what was a strong season for Il Toro, whose seventh place finish secured a Europa League qualifying spot.

On 11 June 2019, Torino triggered Aina's option to permanently transfer from Chelsea for a reported fee of £9 million. He was a regular again during his second season in Turin, playing 37 times in all competitions.

2020–21 season: Loan to Fulham
On 11 September 2020, Aina returned to the Premier League, signing for Fulham on an initial season-long loan with an option to make the deal permanent. On 2 November, Aina scored his first goal for the club, and in the Premier League, in a 2–0 home win over West Brom, shooting into the top-left corner from outside the penalty area. The strike was later selected as the goal of the month by the Premier League. Aina became the third Fulham player to win the Budweiser Goal of the Month award, after Jean Michaël Seri and André Schürrle both won the prize in 2018–19.

International career

England youth teams
Aina has represented England at under-16, under-17, under-18, under-19 and England under-20 levels.

Nigeria

On 28 March 2017, Aina was pictured alongside Chuba Akpom of Arsenal after discussions with Nigeria Football Federation president, Amaju Pinnick. In May 2017, Aina pledged his international future to Nigeria and obtained a Nigerian passport in preparation to making the switch from England to Nigeria. In the same month, he was called up for the first time to play for Nigeria.

In May 2018 he was named in Nigeria's  preliminary 30 man squad for the 2018 World Cup in Russia. However, he did not make the final 23.
He was later recalled into the squad and played a major role in the team's qualification for the 2019 Africa Cup of Nations held in Egypt. He played the first match against tournament debutant Burundi, assisting the only goal of the match.

On 25 December 2021, He was shortlisted in 2021 AFCON Nations Cup by Caretaker Coach Eguavoen as part of the 28-Man Nigeria Squad

Career statistics

Club

International

Personal life
Aina has a brother, Jordan, who is currently playing for Fulham Academy.

Honours

Club
Chelsea Youth
Barclays U21 Premier League: 2013–14
FA Youth Cup: 2013–14, 2014–15
UEFA Youth League: 2014–15, 2015–16

Individual
Premier League Goal of the Month: November 2020

References

External links
England profile at The FA

1996 births
Living people
Footballers from Southwark
Citizens of Nigeria through descent
English footballers
England youth international footballers
Nigerian footballers
Nigeria international footballers
Association football defenders
Chelsea F.C. players
Hull City A.F.C. players
Torino F.C. players
Fulham F.C. players
Premier League players
English Football League players
Serie A players
English expatriate footballers
Nigerian expatriate footballers
Expatriate footballers in Italy
English expatriate sportspeople in Italy
Nigerian expatriate sportspeople in Italy
Black British sportspeople
English people of Nigerian descent
2019 Africa Cup of Nations players
2021 Africa Cup of Nations players